DQ Herculis, or Nova Herculis 1934, was a slow, bright nova occurring in the northern constellation of Hercules in December 1934. This cataclysmic variable star was discovered on 13 December 1934 by J. P. M. Prentice from Stowmarket, Suffolk. It reached peak brightness on 22 December 1934 with an apparent magnitude of 1.5. The nova remained visible to the naked eye for several months.

This is a binary star system consisting of  a white dwarf primary with an estimated 60% of the mass of the Sun and a red dwarf secondary with 40% of the Sun's mass. The system shows orbital period variation, possibly due to the presence of a third body. The orbital plane of the pair is inclined by an angle of 86.5° to the line of sight from the Earth, causing the white dwarf to undergo a deep eclipse every orbit.

DQ Herculis is the prototype for a category of cataclysmic variable stars called intermediate polars. A bright spot in the inner disk appears to pulsate with a 71-second period. In this class of variables, the white dwarf is magnetized, directing infalling matter onto the magnetic poles.

The shell of ejected material from the nova outburst is visible as an emission nebula, similar in appearance to a planetary nebula.  This roughly elliptical nebula had a size of 32.0 × 24.2 arc seconds as of 2018, and it is expanding at a rate of about 0.16 arc seconds per year.

In popular culture

The nova was one of the brightest objects observable in the night sky.  In addition to scientific articles, and received significant coverage in popular news publications. Brad Ricca, an English professor at Case Western Reserve University, has suggested that Nova Herculis may have influenced the development of the origin story of the comic book superhero Superman.

References

External links
 http://www.daviddarling.info/encyclopedia/N/Nova_Herculis_1934.html

Novae
Nova remnants
M-type main-sequence stars
Intermediate polars
Hypothetical planetary systems
Hercules (constellation)
1934 in science
Herculis, DQ
19341213